Kolodeyevka is a rural locality (a village) in Samovetskoye Rural Settlement, Ertilsky District, Voronezh Oblast, Russia. The population was 101 as of 2010. There are 2 streets.

Geography 
Kolodeyevka is located 35 km northwest of Ertil (the district's administrative centre) by road. Gryaztsy is the nearest rural locality.

References 

Rural localities in Ertilsky District